Will Not Be Televised is the second full-length album by the soul band The Solution, recorded att Atlantis Studio and Acetone Studio in Stockholm. The album was released in 2007 on vinyl and in 2008 on CD.

Track listing

Personnel
Scott Morgan – lead vocals, guitar, harmonica, percussion
Nicke Andersson – production, drums, percussion, guitar, backing vocals
Henke "The Duke of Honk" Wilden – piano, organ
Jim Heneghan – bass guitar
Mattias Hellberg – rhythm guitar, lead guitar
Linn Segolson – backing vocals
Clarisse Muvemba – backing vocals
Cecilia Gärding – backing vocals
Jennifer Strömberg – backing vocals
Linnea Sporre – backing vocals
Gustav Bendt – saxophone
Emil Strandberg – trumpet
Janne Hansson – recording engineer
Michael Bork – recording engineer
Stefan Boman – mixing

References

External links
Scoot Morgan – The Solution
Official Site

2008 albums